Aero Mongolia is one of the three national airlines of Mongolia. Its head office is on the third floor of Buyant-Ukhaa International Airport in Ulaanbaatar. It operates domestic flights to eleven destinations, and also operates international scheduled services to Irkutsk, Russia, and to Hohhot, China. Its main base is Chinggis Khaan International Airport.

History 

The airline was established in 2001 and performed its first flight domestically on May 25, 2003. Today, it has over 140 employees (as of December 2014) and operates flights for two destinations internationally, and twelve destinations domestically via its own three Fokker 50 aircraft and two Fokker 100 aircraft. It received its first Fokker 50 in May 2003 and its first Fokker 100 in January 2006. By merging with Monnis Group in June 2007, Aero Mongolia took numerous actions to strengthen its management, to stabilize financial capability and to ensure flight safety.

Destinations 

As of August 2019, Aero Mongolia operated the following services (including domestic charter):

Fleet

Current fleet 
The Aero Mongolia fleet consists of the following aircraft (as of November 2021):

Former fleet 
The airline fleet previously included the following aircraft:
 4 Fokker 50
 2 Fokker 100 (2005-2011)

Frequent flyer program 
SKYMILES is the frequent-flyer program of Aero Mongolia. "SKYMILES" also refers to the bonus card which Aero Mongolia's frequent flyers are given. The program enables passengers to collect 10 tugriks (MNT) from each km they fly. Savings will be automatically calculated (based on flight distance) and collected to passenger’s bonus card. Passengers can make use of their savings whenever they want.

Incidents and accidents 
On 31 October 2007, Mongolian aviation authorities suspended Aero Mongolia flights after the airline failed safety checks. In the first quarter of 2008, Aero Mongolia received the license to fly on domestic routes.

The airline's operations were suspended from January to May 2009 due to the Mongolian Civil Aviation's doubt of flight safety.

On 30 March 2012, Aero Mongolia Fokker 50 aircraft Reg. JU-8257, during takeoff roll in Oyutolgoi Airport, skidded off the runway and the right engine propeller was damaged due to colliding with the side runway lights. The aircraft was written off due to severe damage. There were no fatalities and no injuries.

See also 

 Transportation in Mongolia
 List of companies of Mongolia
 List of airlines of Mongolia
 List of airports in Mongolia

References

External links

Official website 

Airlines of Mongolia
Airlines established in 2002
2002 establishments in Mongolia